"Naima" is a ballad by John Coltrane, composed in 1959, and named after his first wife Juanita Naima Coltrane (née Grubbs).

Naima may also refer to:
 Mustafa Naima (1655–1716), Ottoman historian
 Naima, alternative title of the 1992 album Over the Rainbow by New York Unit
 Naima (Vladislav Delay album), 2002
 Naima, a 1990s jazz band that included Dominique Eade and Joe McPhee
 "Naima", a 1994 lullaby by Angélique Kidjo
 North American Insulation Manufacturers Association; see Glass fiber
 Naima (Eric Dolphy album), 1987

Arabic feminine given names